Kuh Nimeh (also Romanized as Kūh Nīmeh, Kooh Nimeh, and Kūh-e Nīmeh; also known as Kūnemeng) is a village in Halil Rural District, in the Central District of Jiroft County, Kerman Province, Iran. At the 2006 census, its population was 210, in 46 families.

References 

Populated places in Jiroft County